Rubi Rose Benton (born October 2, 1997) is an American rapper, songwriter and model.

Early life 
Rubi Rose Benton was born on October 2, 1997, in Lexington, Kentucky, where she was also raised, by Nardos Ghebrelul, her mother, an Eritrean immigrant dentist raised in Ethiopia, and John Benton, her father, who is a lawyer of Japanese, African American and European descent. Her father was adopted. She has an older sister named Scarlette and a younger sister named Coral. She was baptised as an Orthodox Christian as a child.  She lived for one year in Geneva, Switzerland. She moved to Atlanta, Georgia in her junior year of high school. She attended Brookwood High School in Snellville, Georgia and ran track. She studied politics at Georgia State University. She grew up listening to Prince, Michael Jackson, Biggie, Marvin Gaye and Chaka Khan. She is influenced by Megan Thee Stallion, Cardi B, Nicki Minaj, and Foxy Brown.

Career 
Rose first gained fame as the main model for hip-hop group Migos' music video for the single "Bad and Boujee". Around this time, she started regularly featuring on a Twitch stream with Jamaican-born East Coast Hip Hop Commentator DJ Akademiks. Rose started her music career in September 2018 with a remix of "On Top", a song made by Playboi Carti. In 2019, she made traction with her single "Big Mouth". Rose made a cameo appearance in American rapper Cardi B's music video for her single "WAP", which was released on August 7, 2020. In 2019, she was signed by A&R Chris Turner to LA Reid's record label Hitco Entertainment.

On December 25, 2020, Rose released her first official mixtape, For the Streets, featuring guest appearances from Future and PartyNextDoor.
Rose was featured in the 2021 XXL Freshman List.

Discography 
 For the Streets (2020)

References

External links 
 
 
 

Living people
Musicians from Lexington, Kentucky
American women rappers
American people of Eritrean descent
Southern hip hop musicians
21st-century American rappers
21st-century American women musicians
Songwriters from Kentucky
Rappers from Kentucky
People from Lexington, Kentucky
American people of Japanese descent
Hip hop models
African-American women rappers
African-American female models
21st-century African-American women
21st-century African-American musicians
OnlyFans creators
1997 births
American rappers of Asian descent
21st-century women rappers